Gladiolus (from Latin, the diminutive of gladius, a sword) is a genus of perennial cormous flowering plants in the iris family (Iridaceae).

It is sometimes called the 'sword lily', but is usually called by its generic name (plural gladioli).

The genus occurs in Asia, Mediterranean Europe, South Africa, and tropical Africa. The center of diversity is in the Cape Floristic Region. The genera Acidanthera, Anomalesia, Homoglossum, and Oenostachys, formerly considered distinct, are now included in Gladiolus.

Description
Gladioli grow from round, symmetrical corms (similar to crocuses) that are enveloped in several layers of brownish, fibrous tunics.

Their stems are generally unbranched, producing 1 to 9 narrow, sword-shaped, longitudinal grooved leaves, enclosed in a sheath. The lowest leaf is shortened to a cataphyll. The leaf blades can be plane or cruciform in cross section.

The flowers of unmodified wild species vary from very small to perhaps 40 mm across, and inflorescences bearing anything from one to several flowers. The spectacular giant flower spikes in commerce are the products of centuries of hybridisation and selection.

The flower spikes are large and one-sided, with secund, bisexual flowers, each subtended by 2 leathery, green bracts. The sepals and the petals are almost identical in appearance, and are termed tepals. They are united at their base into a tube-shaped structure. The dorsal tepal is the largest, arching over the three stamens. The outer three tepals are narrower. The perianth is funnel-shaped, with the stamens attached to its base. The style has three filiform, spoon-shaped branches, each expanding towards the apex.

The ovary is 3-locular with oblong or globose capsules, containing many, winged brown, longitudinally dehiscent seeds.

These flowers are variously coloured, ranging from pink to reddish or light purple with white, contrasting markings, or white to cream or orange to red.

Ecology 
The South African species were originally pollinated by long-tongued anthophorini bees, but some changes in the pollination system have occurred, allowing pollination by sunbirds, noctuid and Hawk-moths, long-tongued flies and several others. In the temperate zones of Europe many of the hybrid large flowering sorts of gladiolus can be pollinated by small well-known wasps. Actually, they are not very good pollinators because of the large flowers of the plants and the small size of the wasps. Another insect in this zone which can try some of the nectar of the gladioli is the best-known European Hawk-moth Macroglossum stellatarum which usually pollinates many popular garden flowers like Petunia, Zinnia, Dianthus and others.

Gladioli are used as food plants by the larvae of some Lepidoptera species including the Large Yellow Underwing, and gladiolus thrips.

Horticulture 
Gladioli have been extensively hybridized and a wide range of ornamental flower colours are available from the many varieties. The main hybrid groups have been obtained by crossing between four or five species, followed by selection: 'Grandiflorus', 'Primulines' and 'Nanus'. They can make very good cut flowers for display.

The majority of the species in this genus are diploid with 30 chromosomes (2n=30) but the Grandiflora hybrids are tetraploid and possess 60 chromosomes (2n=4x=60). This is because the main parental species of these hybrids is Gladiolus dalenii which is also tetraploid and includes a wide range of varieties (like the Grandiflora hybrids).

Species
The genus Gladiolus contains about 300 species, the World Checklist of Selected Plant Families had over 276 species in 1988, it accepted 300 species.

There are 260 species of Gladiolus endemic to southern Africa, and 76 in tropical Africa. 
About 10 species are native to Eurasia.

The genus Gladiolus has been divided into many sections. Most species, however, are only tentatively placed. 

 Gladiolus abbreviatus Andrews
 Gladiolus abyssinicus (Brongn. ex Lem.) B.D.Jacks.
 Gladiolus actinomorphanthus P.A.Duvign. & Van Bockstal
 Gladiolus acuminatus F.Bolus
 Gladiolus aequinoctialis Herb.
 Gladiolus alatus L. (sect. Hebea)
 Gladiolus albens Goldblatt & J.C.Manning
 Gladiolus amplifolius Goldblatt
 Gladiolus anatolicus (Boiss.) Stapf
 Gladiolus andringitrae Goldblatt
 Gladiolus angustus L. (sect. Blandus) – long-tubed painted lady
 Gladiolus antakiensis A.P.Ham.
 Gladiolus antandroyi Goldblatt
 Gladiolus appendiculatus G.Lewis
 Gladiolus aquamontanus Goldblatt & Vlok
 Gladiolus arcuatus Klatt
 Gladiolus atropictus Goldblatt & J.C.Manning
 Gladiolus atropurpureus Baker
 Gladiolus atroviolaceus Boiss.
 Gladiolus attilae Kit Tan
 Gladiolus aurantiacus Klatt
 Gladiolus aureus Baker – golden gladiolus
 Gladiolus balensis Goldblatt
 Gladiolus baumii Harms
 Gladiolus bellus C. H. Wright
 Gladiolus benguellensis Baker (sect. Ophiolyza)
 Gladiolus bilineatus G. J. Lewis
 Gladiolus blommesteinii L.Bolus
 Gladiolus bojeri (Baker) Goldblatt
 Gladiolus bonaespei Goldblatt & M.P.de Vos
 Gladiolus boranensis Goldblatt
 Gladiolus brachyphyllus Bolus f.
 Gladiolus brevifolius Jacq. (sect. Linearifolius)
 Gladiolus brevitubus G. Lewis
 Gladiolus buckerveldii (L. Bolus) Goldblatt
 Gladiolus bullatus Thunb. ex G. Lewis – Caledon bluebell.
 Gladiolus caeruleus Goldblatt & J.C. Manning
 Gladiolus calcaratus G. Lewis
 Gladiolus calcicola Goldblatt
 Gladiolus canaliculatus Goldblatt
 Gladiolus candidus (Rendle) Goldblatt
 Gladiolus cardinalis Curtis (sect. Blandus)
 Gladiolus carinatus Aiton – occurring in Darling, South Africa, and locally called the "blou pypie" ("blue pipe")
 Gladiolus carmineus C. H. Wright (sect. Blandus) – cliff lily
 Gladiolus carneus F.Delaroche (sect. Blandus) – large painted lady
 Gladiolus caryophyllaceus (Burm. f.) Poiret
 Gladiolus cataractarum Oberm.
 Gladiolus caucasicus Herb.
 Gladiolus ceresianus L. Bolus
 Gladiolus chelamontanus Goldblatt
 Gladiolus chevalierianus Marais
 Gladiolus communis L. (sect. Gladiolus) – common cornflag, (type species)
 Gladiolus comptonii G.J.Lewis
 Gladiolus crassifolius Baker
 Gladiolus crispulatus L. Bolus
 Gladiolus cruentus T. Moore (sect. Ophiolyza)
 Gladiolus cunonius (L.) Gaertn.
 Gladiolus curtifolius Marais
 Gladiolus curtilimbus P.A.Duvign. & Van Bockstal ex S.Córdova
 Gladiolus cylindraceus G. Lewis
 Gladiolus dalenii  (sect. Ophiolyza)
 Gladiolus davisoniae F.Bolus
 Gladiolus debeerstii De Wild.
 Gladiolus debilis Ker Gawler (sect. Homoglossum) – small painted lady
 Gladiolus decaryi Goldblatt
 Gladiolus decoratus Baker
 Gladiolus delpierrei Goldblatt
 Gladiolus densiflorus Baker
 Gladiolus deserticola Goldblatt
 Gladiolus dichrous (Bullock) Goldblatt
 Gladiolus diluvialis Goldblatt & J.C.Manning
Gladiolus dolichosiphon Goldblatt & J.C.Manning
 Gladiolus dolomiticus Oberm.
 Gladiolus dzavakheticus Eristavi
 Gladiolus ecklonii Lehm.
 Gladiolus elliotii Baker (sect. Ophiolyza)
 Gladiolus emiliae L. Bolus
 Gladiolus engysiphon G. Lewis
 Gladiolus equitans Thunb. (sect. Hebea)
 Gladiolus erectiflorus Baker
 Gladiolus exiguus G. Lewis
 Gladiolus exilis G.J.Lewis
 Gladiolus fenestratus Goldblatt
 Gladiolus ferrugineus Goldblatt & J.C.Manning
 Gladiolus filiformis Goldblatt & J.C.Manning
 Gladiolus flanaganii Baker – suicide gladiolus
 Gladiolus flavoviridis Goldblatt
 Gladiolus floribundus Jacq.
 Gladiolus fourcadei (L.Bolus) Goldblatt & M.P.de Vos
 Gladiolus geardii L. Bolus
 Gladiolus goldblattianus Geerinck
 Gladiolus gracilis Jacq. (sect. Homoglossum) – reed bells
 Gladiolus gracillimus Baker
 Gladiolus grandiflorus Andrews (sect. Blandus)
 Gladiolus grantii Baker
 Gladiolus gregarius Welw. ex Baker (sect. Densiflorus)
 Gladiolus griseus Goldblatt & J.C. Manning
 Gladiolus gueinzii Kunze
 Gladiolus gunnisii (Rendle) Marais
 Gladiolus guthriei F. Bol. (sect. Linearifolius)
 Gladiolus hajastanicus Gabrieljan
 Gladiolus halophilus Boiss. & Heldr.
 Gladiolus harmsianus Vaupel
 Gladiolus hirsutus Jacq. (sect. Linearifolius) – small pink Afrikaner, lapmuis
 Gladiolus hollandii L. Bolus
 Gladiolus horombensis Goldblatt
 Gladiolus huillensis (Welw. ex Baker) Goldblatt
 Gladiolus humilis Stapf
 Gladiolus huttonii (N.E.Br.) Goldblatt & M.P.de Vos
 Gladiolus hyalinus Jacq.
 Gladiolus illyricus W.D.J.Koch – wild gladiolus
 Gladiolus imbricatus L.
 Gladiolus inandensis Baker
 Gladiolus inflatus Thunb.
 Gladiolus inflexus Goldblatt & J.C. Manning
 Gladiolus insolens Goldblatt & J.C. Manning
 Gladiolus intonsus Goldblatt
 Gladiolus invenustus G. J. Lewis
 Gladiolus involutus D.Delaroche (sect. Hebea)
 Gladiolus iroensis (A. Chev.) Marais
 Gladiolus italicus P. Mill. (sect. Gladiolus) – Italian gladiolus, cornflag
 Gladiolus jonquilodorus Eckl. ex G.J.Lewis
 Gladiolus juncifolius Goldblatt
 Gladiolus kamiesbergensis G. Lewis
 Gladiolus karooicus Goldblatt & J.C.Manning
 Gladiolus kotschyanus Boiss.
 Gladiolus lapeirousioides Goldblatt
 Gladiolus laxiflorus Baker
 Gladiolus ledoctei P.A.Duvign. & Van Bockstal
 Gladiolus leonensis Marais
 Gladiolus leptosiphon Bolus f.
 Gladiolus liliaceus Houtt. (sect. Homoglossum)
 Gladiolus linearifolius Vaupel
 Gladiolus lithicola Goldblatt
 Gladiolus longicollis Baker (sect. Homoglossum)
 Gladiolus longispathaceus Cufod.
 Gladiolus loteniensis Hilliard & Burtt
 Gladiolus lundaensis Goldblatt
 Gladiolus luteus Lam.
 Gladiolus macneilii Oberm.
 Gladiolus maculatus Sweet
 Gladiolus magnificus (Harms) Goldblatt
 Gladiolus malvinus Goldblatt & J.C. Manning
 Gladiolus manikaensis Goldblatt
 Gladiolus mariae van der Burgt
 Gladiolus marlothii G. Lewis
 Gladiolus martleyi L. Bolus (sect. Homoglossum)
 Gladiolus meliusculus (G. Lewis) Goldblatt & J.C. Manning
 Gladiolus melleri Baker (sect. Ophiolyza)
 Gladiolus menitskyi Gabrieljan
 Gladiolus mensensis (Schweinf.) Goldblatt
 Gladiolus meridionalis G.J.Lewis
 Gladiolus metallicola Goldblatt
 Gladiolus micranthus Baker, 1901
 Gladiolus microcarpus G. Lewis
 Gladiolus microspicatus P.A.Duvign. & Van Bockstal ex S.Córdova
 Gladiolus miniatus Eckl.
 Gladiolus mirus Vaupel
 Gladiolus monticola G. Lewis ex Goldblatt & J.C. Manning
 Gladiolus mosambicensis Baker
 Gladiolus mostertiae L. Bolus
 Gladiolus muenzneri F. Vaup
 Gladiolus murgusicus Mikheev
 Gladiolus murielae Kelway (syn. G. callianthus) – Abyssinian gladiolus
 Gladiolus mutabilis G.J.Lewis
 Gladiolus negeliensis Goldblatt
 Gladiolus nerineoides G. Lewis
 Gladiolus nigromontanus Goldblatt
 Gladiolus nyasicus Goldblatt
 Gladiolus oatesii Rolfe
 Gladiolus ochroleucus Baker (sect. Densiflorus)
 Gladiolus oliganthus Baker
 Gladiolus oligophlebius Baker
 Gladiolus oppositiflorus Herbert (sect. Ophiolyza)
 Gladiolus orchidiflorus Andrews (sect. Hebea)
 Gladiolus oreocharis Schltr.
 Gladiolus ornatus Klatt
 Gladiolus overbergensis Goldblatt & M.P.de Vos
 Gladiolus palustris Gaudin – marsh gladiolus
 Gladiolus papilio Hook. f. (sect. Densiflorus) – goldblotch gladiolus
 Gladiolus pappei Baker (sect. Blandus)
 Gladiolus pardalinus Goldblatt & J.C. Manning
 Gladiolus parvulus Schltr.
 Gladiolus patersoniae Bolus f.
 Gladiolus pauciflorus Baker ex Oliv.
 Gladiolus pavonia Goldblatt & J.C. Manning
 Gladiolus permeabilis Delaroche (sect. Hebea)
 Gladiolus perrieri Goldblatt
 Gladiolus persicus Boiss.
 Gladiolus phoenix Goldblatt & J.C.Manning
 Gladiolus pole-evansii Verd.
 Gladiolus praecostatus Marais
 Gladiolus pretoriensis Kuntze
 Gladiolus priorii (N. E. Br.) Goldblatt & De Vos
 Gladiolus pritzelii Diels
 Gladiolus puberulus Vaupel
 Gladiolus pubigerus G. Lewis
 Gladiolus pulcherrimus (G. Lewis) Goldblatt & J.C. Manning
 Gladiolus pungens P.A.Duvign. & Van Bockstal ex S.Córdova
 Gladiolus pusillus Goldblatt
 Gladiolus quadrangularis (Burm. f.) Ker Gawler
 Gladiolus quadrangulus (Delaroche) Barnard
 Gladiolus recurvus L. (sect. Homoglossum)
 Gladiolus reginae Goldblatt & J.C.Manning
 Gladiolus rehmannii Baker
 Gladiolus rhodanthus J.C.Manning & Goldblatt
 Gladiolus richardsiae Goldblatt
 Gladiolus robertsoniae Bolus f.
 Gladiolus robiliartianus P.A.Duvign.
 Gladiolus rogersii Baker
 Gladiolus roseolus Chiov.
 Gladiolus roseovenosus Goldblatt & J.C. Manning
 Gladiolus rubellus Goldblatt
 Gladiolus rudis Lichtst. ex Roem. & Schult.
 Gladiolus rufomarginatus G.J.Lewis
 Gladiolus rupicola F. Vaupel
 Gladiolus saccatus (Klatt) Goldblatt & M.P. de Vos
 Gladiolus salmoneicolor P.A.Duvign. & Van Bockstal ex S.Córdova
 Gladiolus salteri G. Lewis
 Gladiolus saundersii Hook. f. – Saunders' gladiolus, Lesotho lily
 Gladiolus saxatilis Goldblatt & J.C.Manning
 Gladiolus scabridus Goldblatt & J.C.Manning
 Gladiolus schweinfurthii Baker
 Gladiolus scullyi Baker
 Gladiolus sekukuniensis P.J.D.Winter
 Gladiolus sempervirens G.J.Lewis
 Gladiolus serapiiflorus Goldblatt
 Gladiolus serenjensis Goldblatt
 Gladiolus sericeovillosus Hook. f.
 Gladiolus serpenticola Goldblatt & J.C. Manning
 Gladiolus somalensis Goldblatt & Thulin
 Gladiolus speciosus Thunb.
 Gladiolus splendens (Sweet) Herbert
 Gladiolus stefaniae Oberm.
 Gladiolus stellatus G. Lewis
 Gladiolus stenolobus Goldblatt
 Gladiolus stenosiphon Goldblatt
 Gladiolus stokoei G.J.Lewis
 Gladiolus subcaeruleus G. Lewis
 Gladiolus sudanicus Goldblatt
 Gladiolus sufflavus (G. Lewis) Goldblatt & J.C. Manning
 Gladiolus sulculatus Goldblatt
 Gladiolus symonsii F.Bolus
 Gladiolus szovitsii Grossh.
 Gladiolus taubertianus Schltr.
 Gladiolus tenuis M. Bieb.
 Gladiolus teretifolius Goldblatt & De Vos
 Gladiolus trichonemifolius Ker Gawl. (sect. Homoglossum)
 Gladiolus triphyllus (Sm.) Ker Gawl.
 Gladiolus tristis L. (sect. Homoglossum)
 Gladiolus tshombeanus P.A.Duvign. & Van Bockstal
 Gladiolus uitenhagensis Goldblatt & Vlok
 Gladiolus undulatus L. (sect. Blandus) – large white Afrikaner, wall gladiolus
 Gladiolus unguiculatus Baker
 Gladiolus usambarensis Marais ex Goldblatt
 Gladiolus uysiae L. Bolus ex G. Lewis
 Gladiolus vaginatus Bolus f. (sect. Homoglossum)
 Gladiolus vandermerwei (L. Bolus) Goldblatt & De Vos
 Gladiolus variegatus (G.J.Lewis) Goldblatt & J.C.Manning
 Gladiolus varius Bolus f.
 Gladiolus velutinus De Wild.
 Gladiolus venustus G. Lewis (sect. Hebea)
 Gladiolus verdickii De Wild. & T.Durand
 Gladiolus vernus Oberm.
 Gladiolus vigilans Barnard
 Gladiolus vinosomaculatus Kies
 Gladiolus violaceolineatus G.J.Lewis
 Gladiolus virescens Thunb. (sect. Hebea)
 Gladiolus virgatus Goldblatt & J.C.Manning
 Gladiolus viridiflorus G. Lewis
 Gladiolus watermeyeri L.Bolus (sect. Hebea)
 Gladiolus watsonioides Baker – Mackinder's gladiolus
 Gladiolus watsonius Thunb. (sect. Homoglossum)
 Gladiolus wilsonii (Baker) Goldblatt & J.C.Manning
 Gladiolus woodii Baker
 Gladiolus zambesiacus Baker
 Gladiolus zimbabweensis Goldblatt

Known hybrids include:
 Gladiolus × colvillii (G. cardinalis × G. tristis): Colville's gladiolus
 Gladiolus × gandavensis (G. dalenii × G. oppositiflorus) (sect. Ophiolyza)
 Gladiolus × hortulanus

Cultivation
In temperate zones, the corms of most species and hybrids should be lifted in autumn and stored over winter in a frost-free place, then replanted in spring. Some species from Europe and high altitudes in Africa, as well as the small 'Nanus' hybrids, are much hardier (to at least ) and can be left in the ground in regions with sufficiently dry winters. 'Nanus' is hardy to Zones 5–8. The large-flowered types require moisture during the growing season, and must be individually staked as soon as the sword-shaped flower heads appear. The leaves must be allowed to die down naturally before lifting and storing the corms. Plants are propagated either from small cormlets produced as offsets by the parent corms, or from seed. In either case, they take several years to get to flowering size.  Clumps should be dug up and divided every few years to keep them vigorous.

They are affected by thrips, (thrip simplex), and wasps Dasyproctus bipunctatus, which burrow into the flowers causing them to collapse and die.

Numerous garden cultivars have been developed, of which ‘Robinetta’ (a G. recurvus hybrid), with pink flowers, has gained the Royal Horticultural Society’s Award of Garden Merit.

In culture
 Gladiolus is the birth flower of August.
 Gladioli are the flowers associated with a fortieth wedding anniversary.
 American Ragtime composer Scott Joplin composed a rag called “Gladiolus Rag”
 "Gladiolus" was the word Frank Neuhauser correctly spelled to win the 1st National Spelling Bee in 1925.
 The Australian comedian and personality Dame Edna Everage's signature flowers are gladioli, which she refers to as "gladdies".
 The ancient Graeco-Roman god Pluto was said to wear a wreath of what is traditionally identified as a type of Gladiolus, called phasganion or xiphion in Koine Greek.
 The Mancunian singer Morrissey is known to dance with gladioli hanging from his back pocket or in his hands, especially during the era of The Smiths. This trait of his was made known in the music video for "This Charming Man", where he swung a bunch of yellow gladioli while singing.

References

Bibliography
 G. R. Delpierre and N. M. du Plessis (1974). The winter-growing Gladioli of Southern Africa. Tafelberg-Uitgewers Beperk 120 colour photographs and descriptions.
 Peter Goldblatt (1996).  A monograph of the genus Gladiolus in tropical Africa (83 species). Timber Press
 Peter Goldblatt, J. C. Manning (1998). Gladiolus in southern Africa: Systematics, Biology, and Evolution, including 144 watercolor paintings. Cape Town: Fernwood Press.

External links

 Taxonomy of Gladiolus in GBIF Biodiversity Data Portal

 
Cormous plants
Garden plants
Iridaceae genera